Frindsbury Extra is a civil parish divided into commercial, suburban residential and rural parts on the Hoo Peninsula in Medway, a ceremonial part of Kent. It is contiguous with the fully urbanised Frindsbury part of Strood and is bounded by Cliffe and Cliffe Woods to the north, Hoo to the east, and the River Medway to the south-east at Upnor (or Upnor-on-Medway) and a long, narrow meander of the river in the far south. On Medway Council it has councillors representing the Strood Rural ward currently on almost identical boundaries.

History
On 30 September 1894, the Local Government Board confirmed an order of Kent County Council, and Frindsbury civil parish was divided into Frindsbury Intra, and Frindsbury Extra. Intra joined the municipal borough of Rochester, while part of Frindsbury Extra joined Strood Rural District. The remaining part of Frindsbury Extra joined Rochester in 1934.

Since 1998 it is one of 11 civil parishes in the Unitary Borough — approximately a quarter of the land of the borough is unparished for local administration.

Geography
As a lowest-level administrative area, Frindsbury Extra contains the villages or dependent residential localities of:
Wainscott (its most populous part, contiguous with Frindsbury)
Upnor on the Medway
Lower Upnor
Upper Upnor
Chattenden
White Wall
Stone Horse.

As with Frindsbury Intra, today known interchangeably as North Strood or Frindsbury, which is contiguous with Strood and immediately north of Strood railway station, Wainscott is south of the A289 dual carriageway.  The rest of the parish is north of this road.  The former council offices of Strood Rural District are in Frindsbury Extra.

Demography

References

External links
Frindsbury Extra Parish Council

Places in Medway